The cabinet of Nicolae Golescu was the government of Romania from 1 May to 15 November 1868.

Ministers
The ministers of the cabinet were as follows:

President of the Council of Ministers:
Nicolae Golescu (1 May - 15 November 1868)
Minister of the Interior: 
Ion C. Brătianu (1 May - 12 August 1868)
(interim) Anton I. Arion (12 August - 2 November 1868)
Anton I. Arion (2 - 15 November 1868)
Minister of Foreign Affairs: 
Nicolae Golescu (1 May - 15 November 1868)
Minister of Finance:
(interim) Ion C. Brătianu (1 May - 12 August 1868)
Ion C. Brătianu (12 August - 15 November 1868)
Minister of Justice:
Anton I. Arion (1 May - 2 November 1868)
Constantin Eraclide (2 - 15 November 1868)
Minister of War:
Col. Gheorghe Adrian (1 May - 12 August 1868)
(interim) Ion C. Brătianu (12 August - 15 November 1868)
Minister of Religious Affairs and Public Instruction:
Dimitrie Gusti (1 May - 15 November 1868)
Minister of Public Works:
Panait Donici (1 May - 15 November 1868)

References

Cabinets of Romania
Cabinets established in 1868
Cabinets disestablished in 1868
1868 establishments in Romania
1868 disestablishments in Romania